Bahoriband is a Tehsil and a Gram panchayat in Katni district in the Indian state of Madhya Pradesh. Bahoriband Tehsil Headquarters is Bahoriband town . It belongs to Jabalpur Division. It is located 44 km towards west from District headquarters Katni. 320 km from State capital Bhopal towards west. 
Bahoriband Tehsil is bounded by Sihora Tehsil towards South, Majhouli Tehsil towards South, Rithi Tehsil towards North, Murwara Tehsil towards East . Jabalpur City, Umaria City, Katni City are the nearby cities to Bahoriband.

Bandhavgarh National Park , Jabalpur (Sanskaardhaani), Bhedaghat , Vijayraghavgarh , Maihar , Panna are the nearby important tourist destinations to see.

Demographics

Hindi is the local language here. Total population of Bahoriband Tehsil is 163,496 living in 35,054 houses, spread across total 197 villages and 79 panchayats. Males are 83,722 and females are 79,774

Pin Codes

483330 ( Bahori Band ), 483331 ( Bakal ), 483442 ( Niwar ), 483440 ( Slleemanabad ), 483336 ( Majholi ), 483775 (Vijayraghavgarh), 483773 ( Badwara ), 483225 ( Sihora )(MP)

Transport

By Rail

There is no railway station near to Bahoriband Tehsil in less than 10 km. How ever Katni Railway Station is major railway station 43 km and Sihora Road Railway station 23.2 km near to Bahoriband. .

By Road

Bahoriband town has 2 major road one Sihora to Bahoriband and other road is Bahoriband to Sleemnabad.

Antiquities
Bahoriband is well known for the famous Shantinath image in the Bahuriband Jain temple with a Kalchuri period inscription. Tigawa, a notable archaeological site with a Gupta period temple, now known as the kankali devi temple, is nearby.

Nearest airport to Bahoriband 
Bahoriband‘s nearest airport is Jabalpur Airport situated at 54.1 km distance.

Education

Bahoriband has many Govt. and Private Schools.

Govt.degree College Bahoriband
Bahoriband Institute of Technology Sindursi
Azad Vivekanand Yuva Sangathan (Sports Club)

Tehsil in Katni
Katni
Cities and towns in Katni district